Doug Yoel is an American singer-songwriter, guitarist, record producer, and head of Now Forward Music/Kindred Rhythm, a record label group based in Woodstock, New York.  It has managed and marketed a variety of record labels including Dreyfus Jazz USA (Disques Dreyfus), Golden Beams Productions, Groovin' High Records, Thelonious Records, RKM Music and others.

References

Year of birth missing (living people)
Living people
American singer-songwriters
Record producers from New York (state)